The 2014–15 Super Division (53rd edition), Algeria's top tier basketball club competition ran from September 12, 2014 through May 31, 2015.

ABC Super Division Participants (2014–15 Season)

Regular Season (September 12, 2014 - ? ? 2015)

Regular season standings
Updated as of 13 October 2017.

 1 loss by default (no point awarded)
 Advance to play-offs Relegated to Nationale B

Stage 2 play-offs (April  - May, 2018)

Play-off standings 

 Advance to championship Final

Championship final

References

Algerian Basketball Championship seasons
League
Algeria